Calcium monophosphide is the inorganic compound with the formula CaP. It is sometimes also known as "calcium phosphide", which also describes a different compound with composition Ca3P2. Calcium monophosphide is a black solid.

Structure and properties
The structures of CaP and sodium peroxide (Na2O2) are very similar.  The solid is described as a salt: (Ca2+)2P24−, or Ca2P2.  Since the bonding is ionic, the diphosphide centers carry negative charge and are easily protonated.  Upon hydrolysis this material releases diphosphine (P2H4):
Ca2P2  +  4 H2O   →   2 Ca(OH)2  +  P2H4
The hydrolyses of CaP and calcium carbide (CaC2) are similar, except that diphosphine spontaneously ignites in air.  Thus, CaP must be protected from air.

CaP decomposes to Ca3P2 at about 600 °C.

3 CaP   →   Ca3P2  +  1/4 P4

References

Phosphides
Calcium compounds